Parri Ceci (born September 3, 1961) is a former professional football player who was a receiver with the Calgary Stampeders of the Canadian Football League's (CFL) in the mid-1980s.

Ceci held the Vanier Cup record for the longest touchdown catch, with an 89-yard reception in 1984, while playing with the Guelph Gryphons.

Ceci now works for the federal government as a database administrator. His son, Cody Ceci, is a professional hockey player who was drafted by the Ottawa Senators in 2012 and currently plays for the Edmonton Oilers.

References

1961 births
Living people
Calgary Stampeders players
Canadian football wide receivers
Guelph Gryphons football players
Players of Canadian football from Ontario
Canadian football people from Ottawa